Zangatihal is a village in Belgaum district in the northern state of Karnataka, India.

This place is mainly agricultural land n well irrigated land locates just besides ghataprabha and malaprabha river

References

Villages in Belagavi district